Enkhsaikhany Nyam-Ochir (Mongolian: Энхсайханы Ням-Очир) is a Mongolian male wrestler. Bronze Medalist World Wrestling Championships 2014.

References 

Mongolian male sport wrestlers
1985 births
Living people
World Wrestling Championships medalists
Asian Wrestling Championships medalists